Jerry Zrymiak (born October 19, 1948 in Regina, Saskatchewan) is a Canadian retired professional ice hockey player who played 155 games in the World Hockey Association for the Michigan Stags, Los Angeles Sharks, Toronto Toros, and Minnesota Fighting Saints.

References

External links

1948 births
Baltimore Blades players
Canadian ice hockey defencemen
Greensboro Generals (EHL) players
Greensboro Generals (SHL) players
Ice hockey people from Saskatchewan
Los Angeles Sharks players
Michigan Stags players
Minnesota Fighting Saints players
Living people
Sportspeople from Regina, Saskatchewan
Toronto Toros players